John Lundon (1828 – 7 February 1899) was a 19th-century Member of Parliament from Northland, New Zealand.

Born in County Limerick, Ireland, he arrived in Auckland in 1843. He represented Raglan and Onehunga on the Auckland Provincial Council. He was a hotel-keeper in Auckland, and an entrepreneur in Auckland and Samoa.

He represented the  electorate from 1879 to 1881, when he was defeated by Richard Hobbs standing in the  electorate.

References

1829 births
1899 deaths
Members of the New Zealand House of Representatives
Members of the Auckland Provincial Council
New Zealand businesspeople
Irish emigrants to New Zealand (before 1923)
New Zealand Roman Catholics
Unsuccessful candidates in the 1881 New Zealand general election
Unsuccessful candidates in the 1890 New Zealand general election
Unsuccessful candidates in the 1887 New Zealand general election
New Zealand MPs for North Island electorates
19th-century New Zealand politicians